The A3071 is a minor 'A' road in the English county of Cornwall, which links St Just to Penzance and the A30. It is 6.2 miles long.

History
In the early 19th-century, mines in the parish of St Just were flourishing but there were no natural harbours along the north coast. Mule trains, pack-horses or wagons with four horses carried copper and tin to the harbour at the stannary town of Penzance. The wagons often grounded at the ford in the village of Hallen Tachen and a report in The West Briton newspaper on 26 May 1843 indicated that a bridge was to be built by Mr Edward Harvey of Penzance. The bridge was funded by the mining industry and Nicholas Holman who had transferred his foundry from Copperhouse, Hayle to Tregeseal in 1834. The two-span grade II listed bridge was a rebuild of an older bridge, from which the parapets and terminal refuges survive. The bridge is built of granite ashlar with granite dressings except for the rubble walls of the older bridge. The wider span is over the stream and a narrow span over the leat to Roskennals Mill. There is an inscription of ″EH″ on the north side and ″1843″ on the southern side. The village of Hallen Tachen is now known as Newbridge.

Turnpike
In 1863 the Penwith Turnpike Trust (later the Penzance and St Just Turnpike Trust) was formed. The road was the link between the mining region along the coast from St Just to Pendeen and carried heavy mining traffic to the harbour at the stannary town of Penzance. The Turnpike included two branches,
 the current B3318 which leaves the A3071 at Deveral Common and crosses Boscaswell HIgher Downs. On Woon Gumpas Common the road splits with one branch reaching the north coast road at Trewellard and the other at Portheras Cross. Before the turnpike the original road left the A3071 at HIgher Tregerest, taking a steeper route over Dry Carn Hill. 
 a road now known as Turnpike Road or New Road, leaving the A3071 at a road junction to Sancreed, serving the foundry at Nancherrow.

The turnpike provided an easier route for the teams of four horses and wagons which had replaced pack mules. A toll was charged to use the road, which was let by yearly auction. Before the turnpike was formed the mines of St Just were doing well and it was estimated that moderate tolls would raise £800 annually. The Turnpike Act was to last 21 years from 1863 and loans of £6,300 pounds were advanced, including £1750 and £1,250 from the Bolitho and, Batten, Carne and Carne banks, respectively, with the rest from bond-holders. The tolls were let for £1000. In the late 1860s there was less traffic as mines closed, miners emigrated and the tolls collected dropped to £500 annually. The bond-holders did not receive any interest for a number of years around 1870 and due to falling revenue the St Just end of the road was not completed. Despite the original estimate of an income of £800 per annum, in 1882, for example, the winning bid for running the turnpike was £550. There was a continuation Act in 1884 and the Turnpike Trust finally closed in November 1885.

The Toll House at Tremethick Cross was put up for auction on 9 June 1886, and withdrawn by the owner Mr T S Bolitho when the £98 reserve was not reached; the top bid was £40.

Milestones
A number of milestones and guide stones mark the route, some still surviving in their original position. They are of two designs, the earlier ones which predate the Turnpike Trust have arched tops and the ones erected by the trust have pyramidal tops. Some are listed,

A3071

References

Sources

 
A3071
 
 
 
 
 
 
 
 
 

B3318

Bibliography

External links
 SABRE - A3071

Roads in Cornwall
A3071
A3071